The 64th Coast Artillery was a Coast Artillery regiment in the United States Army.

History

Lineage
Constituted as 64th Artillery (CAC) on 15 January 1918 and organized 17 May 1918 as follows:
 HHC at Fort Barrancas
 A Battery at Fort Screven
 B Battery at Fort Dade
 C Battery at Fort Barrancas
 D Battery at Jackson Barracks
 E Battery at Jackson Barracks
 F Battery at Fort Crockett
 Supply Battery Fort Crockett
Staged at Camp Upton assigned to 34th Brigade (CAC), arrived in France 6 September 1918. Departed France 10 February 1919. Demobilized at Camp Eustis 1 April 1919.
Hawaiian AA Regiment constituted 2 May 1921 and organized 3 June 1921 at Fort Ruger with personnel from companies of Coast Artillery Oahu. as follows:
 HHB, HHD&CT
Gun Battalion HHB
 A Battery
 B Battery
 C Battery
 D Battery (SL)
Machine Gun Battalion HHB
 E Battery
 F Battery
 G Battery
 H Battery (SL)
Regiment moved to Fort Shafter 27 January 1922 searchlight batteries switched with A, and D batteries.
 Redesignated 64th Artillery (AA) (CAC) 2 June 1922
 Redesignated 64th Coast Artillery (AA) Regiment 1 July 1924
Reorganized 1 November 1925 with 3 battalions as follows:
 HHB and Service Battery
1st BN HHB
 A Battery
 B Battery
 C Battery
2nd BN HHB
 D Battery
 E Battery
 F Battery
3rd BN HHB
 G Battery
 H Battery
 I Battery
Batteries K and L added 1 July 1928, also a Band.
 Battery F assigned to Baker Island 1 August 1943, redesignated Battery D, 751st Coast Artillery (AA) Battalion (Sep).
Inactivated 12 December 1943 and broken up as follows:
 HHB redesignated 136th AAA Group
 1st Battalion redesignated 64th AAA (Gun) Battalion
 2nd Battalion (less Battery F) redesignated 750th AAA (Gun) Battalion
 3rd Battalion redesignated 864th AAA (AW) Battalion
64th AAA (Gun) Battalion assigned to Guam 10 September 1944. Inactivated 30 May 1946. Reactivated 11 April 1949 at Atsugi, Honshu, Japan.
 Redesignated 17 December 1954 as the 64th Antiaircraft Artillery Battalion.
Inactivated 25 September 1957 in Japan.

Distinctive unit insignia
 Description
A round of Antiaircraft Artillery ammunition Gules winged Or. The insignia is 1 inch (2.54 cm) in height.
 Symbolism
The winged antiaircraft artillery projectiles represent the mission of the organization.
 Background
The distinctive unit insignia was originally approved for the 64th Artillery Regiment, Coast Artillery Corps on 25 July 1922. It was amended to correct the description on 10 January 1923. It was amended to specify how it was worn on 5 November 1931. The insignia was redesignated for the 64th Antiaircraft Artillery Battalion on 18 November 1955.

Coat of arms

Blazon
 Shield
Gules, an inescutcheon barry of eight Argent, of the field and Azure repeated.
 Crest
On a wreath of the colors Argent and Gules, a round of Antiaircraft Artillery ammunition Gules winged Or.
 Motto 
We Aim High

Symbolism
 Shield
The shield is scarlet for Artillery and bears an inescutcheon, the first quarter of the Royal Hawaiian coat of arms.
 Crest
The winged antiaircraft artillery projectiles represent the mission of the organization.

Background
The coat of arms was originally approved for the Hawaiian Antiaircraft Artillery Regiment, Coast Artillery Corps on 8 March 1922. It was redesignated for the 64th Regiment, Coast Artillery Corps on 10 June 1922. It was redesignated for the 64th Antiaircraft Artillery Gun Battalion on 5 January 1944. The insignia was redesignated for the 64th Antiaircraft Artillery Battalion on 18 November 1955.

Current units
Not active

Campaign streamers
World War I
 Streamer without inscription
World War II
 Central Pacific
 Western Pacific

Decorations
None

References

External links

064
Military units and formations established in 1918
Military units and formations disestablished in 1957